I Ain't Mad No More is the second album by Virginia–native rapper Skillz. The album featured guest appearances by Missy "Misdemeanor" Elliott, Danja Mowf, Kandi, Pretty Ugly, Big Swells, Musiq Soulchild, AAries, Cee-Lo Green, Pretty Willie, Jazze Pha and Nicole Wray's brother Kenny Wray.

The album generated one charting single, "Crew Deep", which peaked at #83 on Billboard Hot R&B/Hip-Hop Songs. Two other promo singles, "Your Favorite Joints" and "Ghostwriter," were excluded from the album but were added to its sampler release. The lack of success from the album's lead single ("Crew Deep") resulted in a cancellation of the album's U.S. release and a granted promotional release in Canada was made instead. However, Skillz would feature most of the album's tracks on his U.S. independent release, Confessions of a Ghostwriter (2005).

Track listing

Leftover tracks
"Your Favorite Joints"
"Full Cooperation"
"Off the Wall" (produced by Timbaland)
"Ghostwriter"

References

External links
Skillz - I Ain't Mad No More images on Discogs

2002 albums
Skillz albums
Rawkus Records albums
Albums produced by the Neptunes
Albums produced by Nottz
Albums produced by Timbaland
Albums produced by Hi-Tek